Carlos Pascual could refer to:  

Carlos Pascual (baseball) (1931-2011), Cuban baseball player
Carlos Pascual (diplomat) (born 1959), American diplomat